The Copyright Board of Canada is an economic regulatory body empowered to establish, either mandatorily or at the request of an interested party, the royalties to be paid for the use of copyrighted works, when the administration of such copyright is entrusted to a collective-administration society. The Board also has the right to supervise agreements between users and licensing bodies and issues licences when the copyright owner cannot be located.

The Honourable Robert A. Blair is the current Chairman of the Board of Directors.

See also 
 Copyright Act of Canada
 Copyright law of Canada
Robert A. Blair

References

External links 
 Copyright Board of Canada website

Federal departments and agencies of Canada
Innovation, Science and Economic Development Canada
Canadian copyright law
Copyright collection societies
Canada